The men's doubles soft tennis event was part of the soft tennis programme and took place on December 8, at the Khalifa International Tennis and Squash Complex.

Schedule
All times are Arabia Standard Time (UTC+03:00)

Results

Finals

Top half

Bottom half

References 

Official Website

External links 
soft-tennis.org

Soft tennis at the 2006 Asian Games